Calamis may refer to two sculptors of ancient Greece:

Calamis (5th century BC)
Calamis (4th century BC)

See also
 Calamus (disambiguation)